Yongming Yanshou (904–976) was a prominent Buddhist monk during the Five Dynasties and Ten Kingdoms period and early Song Dynasty in China.

Biography
Yongming Yanshou is first mentioned in biographical form by Zanning (贊寧) in a work called the Song Biographies of Eminent Monks, which was produced in 988, 12 years after Yanshou's death.

Yanshou lived largely during the Five Dynasties and Ten Kingdoms period, in the independent Wuyue kingdom. This age was characterized by nearly continuous warfare and political disorder. The future of Buddhism was especially uncertain during this time due to widespread suppression and sponsored destruction of temples. However, most of this activity took place in the north of China, while Yanshou resided in the independent Wuyue kingdom of the south, which was relatively stable during this time. Furthermore, unlike the trouble Buddhism faced in the north, the ruling Qian family heavily patronized Buddhist and other religious institutions.

He was born in either the capital city of Wuyue, modern-day Hangzhou, or a suburb of it, Yuhang, in the year 904. He would have served as an official before becoming a monk, although the exact nature of the position is disagreed upon in biographical sources. He probably became a monk around 932 under the Zen teacher Ts'ui Yen. At some point he left his initial teacher and went to Mount Tiantai, where his attainment was confirmed by the teacher Tiantai Dehshao. Around 952 he again moved, this time to Mount Xuědòu (雪窦山), where he served as a teacher and apparently attracted many students. He is said to have practiced seated chanting and silent meditation.

In 960, the King of Wuyue, Qian Chu, assigned Yanshou to be the abbot of Lingyin Temple, which the king had recently re-established. Only a year later in 961, the king relocated Yanshou to the newly constructed Yongming Temple, from which he would take his name. Here Yanshou is said to have become very prominent. He received gifts from the King of Korea, Gwangjong of Goryeo, and in return he ordained 36 Korean monks, who then returned home to teach. In 974 he returned to Mount Tiantai, and the following year he died.

Teachings and influence
Yongming Yanshou is best known for attempting to synthesize the diverse and seemingly contradictory teachings of the various schools of Buddhism that existed in China. He is often associated with Pure Land Buddhism and Zen, but Pure Land largely formed after his lifetime, and he is largely concerned with Huayan in his writings, equating Huayan as when the teachings on the One Mind relies on doctrine (Yi Jiao) and these teachings are in the form of Chan when this Mind is directly revealed.
Because he held views that conflicted with the Rinzai tradition, which came to be the dominant school of Japanese Zen, he has been criticized or marginalized in many later accounts of Zen history. As a result of this, he was largely ignored by Western scholars of Chan in the 20th century, most of whom worked from a Japanese perspective. Nonetheless, recent Western scholarship recognizes his importance, and he has been an enduring influential figure in the eyes of Chinese, Korean, and Vietnamese branches of Zen, and he is deeply revered in the Pure Land school.

References

Further reading
 Benn, James A (2007), Burning for the Buddha, University of Hawaii Press, pp. 104-131. 
 Wu, Zhongwei (2007), The mind as the essence of words: A linguistic philosophical analysis of the classification teaching of Yongming Yanshou. Frontiers of Philosophy in China 2 (3), 336-344

904 births
976 deaths
Song dynasty Buddhist monks
Wuyue Buddhist monks
10th-century Chinese people
Chinese Zen Buddhists
Five Dynasties and Ten Kingdoms people born during Tang
Later Jin (Five Dynasties) Buddhist monks
Liao dynasty Buddhist monks
Later Han (Five Dynasties) Buddhist monks
Later Zhou Buddhist monks